Paul Merton's Adventures is a comedy series, broadcast on the British television channel Channel 5 in October and November 2011. It starred the British comedian Paul Merton along with Peter Anderson and Stephen Frost. The series consists of 6 episodes, each based on a type of holiday.

Scenario
Merton keeps his comically-critical attitude while sampling some popular holiday types that never appealed to him, unlike millions of Britons. They range from cruises and 'extreme' holidays overseas (Ibiza, Florida) to English coastal resorts and adventurous Scotland.

List of episodes

External links

2011 British television series debuts
2011 British television series endings
Channel 5 (British TV channel) original programming
Television series by Endemol
Television series by Tiger Aspect Productions
British travel television series